The Dune Shacks of Peaked Hill Bars Historic District includes dune shacks that were home to American artists and writers from the 1920s to present day. The historic district, located in the Outer Cape towns of Provincetown and Truro, comprises 1,950 acres of the Cape Cod National Seashore. It was listed on the National Register of Historic Places in 2012. The name is derived from a Life-Saving Station known as Peaked Hill Bars that was established in 1882 on the lower cape.

History of the Dune Shacks
Before the current shacks were built beginning around 1920, there were shacks built in the dunes to house members of the United States Life-Saving Service, whose mission was to assist survivors of shipwrecks along the largely unpopulated coastline of the United States. These shacks were built by the Massachusetts Humane Society and were also designed to provide shelter and supplies to washed-ashore sailors whose ship might have been wrecked in a storm. The dune shacks are mentioned by Henry David Thoreau in his book Cape Cod published in 1865.

During the 1920s, the current shacks were beginning to be built, reputedly using the flotsam of washed up shipwrecks. These shacks were appealing to the many artists and writers who had begun to be attracted to the artist's colony in Provincetown; they would live in the spartan solitude of the shacks writing or painting. "Probably the most famous of these was playwright Eugene O'Neill, who purchased one and spent many summers there with his second wife, Agnes Boulton. O'Neill penned Anna Christie (1920) and The Hairy Ape (1921) while living in his shack, and in doing so gave the whole collection of dune shacks something of an arty cachet."

Other artists and writers lived in the primitive dune shacks, including Harry Kemp who proclaimed himself "the Poet of the Dunes," Jack Kerouac, e. e. cummings, Norman Mailer, and Jackson Pollock. In 2016, musician and artist Jacob Bannon stayed in one of the dune shacks for seven days painting and recording music, culminating in the release of a book and album both under the name Dunedevil. The shacks have never had electricity, plumbing, or running water.

Writers who wrote about the dune shacks, besides Thoreau, included Henry Beston, whose The Outermost House chronicles a season spent living in the dune shacks, and Hazel Hawthorne-Werner, who wrote Salt House about her year in the dunes in 1929. *** The Outermost House is in Eastham, near the Lifeguard Station, Cape Cod National Seashore. ('He looked out onto the  o p e n  Atlantic Ocean.')

Today, there are 19 dune shacks in the historic district, 18 of which are owned by the National Park Service. Private individuals are able to enter a lottery for an opportunity to reside for a period of time in the shacks. The only way to tour the Dune Shacks is through Art's Dune Tours in Provincetown.

Dune environment
Besides the dune shacks, the vast majority of the historic district is undeveloped dune landscape. One of the purposes of the historic district is preservation of the unspoiled dune landscape that has provided so many artists with inspiration. A plethora of cranberry bogs exist where the natural aquifer comes up through low-lying dunes.

Origin of the name
Peaked Hill Bars refers to one of the nine United States Life-Saving Service stations established on Cape Cod in 1882. Peaked Hill Bars was later a United States Coast Guard station that was discontinued in 1938. In deciding where to erect the station at Peaked Hill Bars, it was said at the time that, "[a] more bleak or dangerous stretch of coast can hardly be found in the United States than at this station. The coast near the station rightly bears the name ‘ocean graveyard.’ Sunken rips stretch far out under the sea at this place, ever ready to grasp the keels of the ships that sail down upon them, and many appalling disasters have taken place here. There are two lines of bars that lie submerged off the shore ... these bars are ever shifting."

See also
National Register of Historic Places listings in Barnstable County, Massachusetts
National Register of Historic Places listings in Cape Cod National Seashore
 Art's Dune Tours

References

External links
National Park Service article describing the Dune Shacks

2012 establishments in Massachusetts
Cape Cod National Seashore
Historic districts in Barnstable County, Massachusetts
Historic districts on the National Register of Historic Places in Massachusetts
National Register of Historic Places in Barnstable County, Massachusetts
Protected areas established in 2012
Provincetown, Massachusetts
Truro, Massachusetts